Heinz Siegfried Vieluf Cabrera (born 30 March 1959) is a businessman and politician from the Dominican Republic. He was Senator for the province of Monte Cristi, from 2006 to 2020.

Vieluf founded the Fundación Heinz Vieluf Cabrera foundation.

References 

Living people
1959 births
Dominican Republic people of German descent
People from Santiago de los Caballeros
Dominican Republic businesspeople
Dominican Republic philanthropists
Dominican Liberation Party politicians
Members of the Senate of the Dominican Republic